USS LCI(L)-189 was an amphibious assault ship commissioned in 1943 by the United States Navy and assigned to the Mediterranean theater during World War II. As part of Operation Husky, LCI(L)-189 participated in the allied landings in Sicily from 9–15 July 1943. From 9–21 September 1943 LCI(L)-189 took part in the Salerno landings during Operation Avalanche.

LCI(L)-189 saw action during Operation Shingle as part of the Anzio and Nettuno advanced landings on 22 January 1944 and other west coast of Italy operations during February – March, 1944. She took part in the Elba and Pianosa landings on 17 June 1944 before being assigned to Operation Dragoon, the invasion of southern France, from 15 August – 16 September 1944.

LCI(L)-189 was transferred to the Maritime Commission for disposal on 24 November 1947.

See Also: 
Landing Craft Infantry
List of United States Navy Landing Craft Infantry (LCI)
List of United States Navy amphibious warfare ships

Awards, Citations and Campaign Ribbons

References
 "USS LCI(L)-189" NavSource Online. NavSource Naval History. Retrieved 2010-02-02.
 "Landing Craft, Infantry (Large) – LCI(L)" Shipbuilding History. Retrieved 2010-02-02.

External links
 http://www.usslci.com

1943 ships
Landing craft